Pietro Filomarini (died 1420) was a Roman Catholic prelate who served as Archbishop of Reggio Calabria (1404–1420).

Biography
On 4 August 1404, he was appointed during the papacy of Pope Boniface IX as Archbishop of Reggio Calabria.
He served as Archbishop of Reggio Calabria until his death in 1420.

References

External links and additional sources
 (for Chronology of Bishops) 
 (for Chronology of Bishops) 

15th-century Italian Roman Catholic archbishops
Bishops appointed by Pope Boniface IX
1420 deaths